Aldaír Caputa Ferreira (born 26 March 1998) is an Angolan professional footballer who plays as a midfielder for lithuanian club Džiugas in A Lyga.

Club career
Aldaír was born in Luanda, Angola but moved to Portugal at early age. He joined Sporting CP as a 10-year-old and spent five years training at the club before joining Gil Vicente at the age of 15.

Aldaír started his senior career at Oliveirense in 2017 and remained there until 2018 when signing for Vilaverdense.

On 23 September 2020, Aldaír joined as a free agent Bulgarian club Etar Veliko Tarnovo, signing a two-year contract. Two days later he made his Bulgarian First League debut in a 5–1 away loss against CSKA 1948 Sofia.

In July 2022 he signed with lithuanian FC Džiugas. On 27 August he scored the goal against FK Panevėžys.

References

External links
Player Profile at foradejogo.net

1998 births
Living people
Angolan footballers
C.D. Cova da Piedade players
SFC Etar Veliko Tarnovo players
First Professional Football League (Bulgaria) players
Association football midfielders
Angolan expatriate footballers
Expatriate footballers in Portugal
Expatriate footballers in Bulgaria
Vilaverdense F.C. players
Rodos F.C. players
Asteras Vlachioti F.C. players